Attorney General Olds may refer to:

Chauncey N. Olds (1816–1890), Attorney General of Ohio
Lewis P. Olds (fl. 1860s–1880s), Attorney General of North Carolina

See also
General Olds (disambiguation)